Yusuf Estes (born: Joseph Estes, 1944), is an American from Texas who reverted from Christianity to Islam in 1991. He has served as a Muslim chaplain for the United States Bureau of Prisons during the 1990s, and has served as a delegate to the United Nations World Peace Conference for Religious Leaders held at the UN in September 2000.

Estes has served as a guest presenter and a keynote speaker at various Islamic events.  Estes was named as the Islamic Personality of the Year at the Dubai International Holy Quran Award ceremony on 8 August 2012.

Estes is the founder and president of Guide US TV, a free-to-air Internet and satellite TV channel, which broadcasts programs about Islam. In 2010 Estes was list as one of the top 500 most influential Muslims.

In November 2017, Estes was denied entry into Singapore for having expressed views which were "unacceptable" and "contrary" to the values of Singapore's multiracial and multi-religious society. His "divisive views breed intolerance and exclusivist practices that will damage social harmony, and cause communities to drift apart," according to the Singapore Ministry of Home Affairs.

See also
 List of American Muslims

References

External links

1944 births
Living people
American Muslims
American Sunni Muslims
American chaplains
Muslim chaplains
American former Christians
Muslim apologists
American Salafis
Jones High School (Orlando, Florida) alumni
Islamic television preachers
Converts to Islam from Christianity
21st-century Muslim scholars of Islam
21st-century Muslims